Golam Kibria Tipu is a Jatiya Party (Ershad) politician and the incumbent Member of Parliament of Barisal-3.

Early life
Tipu was born on 2 September 1953. He completed his undergraduate in science.

Career
Tipu was elected to parliament from Barisal-3 as a Jatiya Party (Ershad) candidate 30 December 2018.

References

Jatiya Party politicians
Living people
9th Jatiya Sangsad members
11th Jatiya Sangsad members
Year of birth missing (living people)